Northlake Mall is a two-story modern shopping mall located eight miles (13 km) north of center city Charlotte, North Carolina off Interstate 77 at exit 18, Harris Blvd, and off Interstate 485 at exit 21, also at Harris Blvd. The mall was owned by Starwood Capital Group and is currently managed by Spinoso Real Estate Group.

History
In 2005, when Northlake Mall opened, it filled a void for the lack of retail in the northern portion of Mecklenburg County. A mall had been planned for this region for years, but plans never materialized until a few years prior to the mall's opening. It has become the dominant retail destination for the thriving communities in North Charlotte and the Lake Norman region, from where it gets its name.

It was announced in 2013 that Northlake Mall would receive Charlotte's second H&M store, after the recently announced store at Carolina Place Mall. These two stores, along with the planned store at the SouthPark Mall, would be the only H&M stores in the Charlotte area.

In June 2014, it was announced that Taubman Centers would sell Northlake Mall to Starwood Capitol Group, as part of a portfolio of malls, for an aggregate purchase price for the portfolio of $1.4 billion.

In February 2016, Starwood Capitol Group announced a $50 million expansion of the mall, adding an additional 200,000 square feet.

Dick's Sporting Goods closed in February 2021, in favor of the location at Concord Mills Mall. Apple Inc. closed their store without notice on March 1, 2023 due to 3 shootings at the mall in 75 days.

Anchor stores
The mall's anchor stores include:

AMC Theatres
Belk (
Dillard's (
Macy's (opened as Hecht's, converted to Macy's in 2006.

Junior anchor stores
H&M (Space previously occupied by Borders Books and Music from 2005 to 2011, remodeled as an H&M in 2014.

Former anchor stores
Dick's Sporting Goods (closed in February 2021

References

External links

Shopping malls in Charlotte, North Carolina
Shopping malls established in 2005
Taubman Centers